Sybil Brand (née Morris; May 8,  – February 17, 2004) was an American philanthropist and activist, best known locally for her work in improving jail conditions for women in Los Angeles. She was the namesake of the Sybil Brand Institute (SBI), a women's jail in Los Angeles County. SBI was closed after the 1994 Northridge earthquake.

Early life
Sybil Morris was born in Chicago, Illinois to Jewish immigrant parents Abraham "A.W." Morris (–1951) and Hattie Morris (–1969) sometime between 1899 and 1903, with some of her friends favoring the earliest year.

Her father, a stockbroker, relocated the family to Los Angeles when Sybil was two years old. At age twelve, she began what would become a lifelong pursuit of charity and volunteering when she organized a diaper hemming program with the other girls in her class. Brand would later recall being inspired by meeting a young triple amputee in a hospital at the insistence of her mother.

Prison reform
Already well-known in charity circles, Brand was first named to the Public Welfare Commission in 1945 by then-Supervisor Leonard Roach. In the 1950s, Brand was serving on a commission that inspected hospitals and jails in Los Angeles County. The only commissioner to volunteer to inspect the jails, Brand was appalled at the conditions in which women were jailed. At the time, some 1800 women were being held in facilities designed to hold 1300, on the thirteenth floor of the Los Angeles Hall of Justice.

After this incident, Brand led a drive to build a new county jail for women. On January 29, 1963, Los Angeles County opened the Sybil Brand Institute, which was forced to close after the 1994 Northridge earthquake. Budget shortfalls delayed its remodeling and reopening. Women prisoners most recently have been housed in the Twin Towers Correctional Facility in downtown Los Angeles.

Personal life
In 1926, she married her first husband, Gabriel "Gabe" Leavy in Los Angeles; they had one son, George. In 1933, she married her second husband, Harry Brand, who became head of publicity and advertising at 20th Century Fox.

Notes

References

Year of birth uncertain
2004 deaths
20th-century American Jews
20th-century American philanthropists
21st-century American Jews
American centenarians
American human rights activists
Jewish American philanthropists
Women centenarians
Women human rights activists